Bráz Magaldi (9 June 1897 – 30 July 1987) was a Brazilian sports shooter. He competed in the 25 m rapid fire pistol event at the 1932 Summer Olympics.

References

External links
 

1897 births
1987 deaths
Brazilian male sport shooters
Olympic shooters of Brazil
Shooters at the 1932 Summer Olympics
Sportspeople from Minas Gerais